Gwanggyo Lake Park is a park in Ha-dong, Yeongtong-gu, Suwon, South Korea, with 3 million visitors each year.

References

External links

Parks in Gyeonggi Province
Tourist attractions in Suwon